The 1955 Taça de Portugal Final was the final match of the 1954–55 Taça de Portugal, the 15th season of the Taça de Portugal, the premier Portuguese football cup competition organized by the Portuguese Football Federation (FPF). The match was played on 12 June 1955 at the Estádio Nacional in Oeiras, and opposed two Primeira Liga sides: Benfica and Sporting CP. Benfica defeated Sporting CP 2–1 to claim their eighth Taça de Portugal.

Match

Details

References

1955
Taca
S.L. Benfica matches
Sporting CP matches